Rhineland is a former provincial electoral division in the Canadian province of Manitoba.  It was created by redistribution in 1892, and eliminated in 1914, when it merged into the new riding of Morden and Rhineland.  It was re-established in 1949, and eliminated again in 1989.  As its name implies, Rhineland was home to several German settlers, many of whom were Mennonites.  It is named after the Rhineland region of Germany.

Jacob Froese, the last Social Credit MLA in Manitoba history, represented this riding from 1959 until 1973.

Rhineland's territory was integrated into the riding of Emerson in 1989.

List of provincial representatives

Election results

Former provincial electoral districts of Manitoba